Betaarterivirus is a genus of enveloped, positive-strand RNA viruses which infect vertebrates. The genus is in the family Arteriviridae and order Nidovirales. The genus contains four subgenera and six species.

Structure 
Member viruses are enveloped, spherical, and 45–60 nm in diameter.

Genome 
Betaarteriviruses have a positive-sense single-stranded RNA genome.

Taxonomy 
The genus Betaarterivirus contains four subgenera and six species:

Ampobartevirus
Betaarterivirus suid 2

Chibartevirus
Betaarterivirus chinrav 1
Betaarterivirus ninrav
Betaarterivirus sheoin

Eurpobartevirus
Betaarterivirus suid 1

Mibartevirus
Betaarterivirus timiclar

References 

Nidovirales
Arteriviridae
Virus genera